Kamenovo is a rural locality (a village) in Vakhromeyevskoye Rural Settlement, Kameshkovsky District, Vladimir Oblast, Russia. The population was 56 as of 2010.

Geography 
Kamenovo is located 9 km north of Kameshkovo (the district's administrative centre) by road. Edemskoye is the nearest rural locality.

References 

Rural localities in Kameshkovsky District